Windfall Brook is a river in Delaware County, New York. It flows into Loomis Brook south-southwest of the hamlet of Loomis.

References

Rivers of New York (state)
Rivers of Delaware County, New York